Dominion Christian School is a private, classical Christian school. It is an accredited member of the Southern Association of Independent Schools.  It is also a member of the Association of Classical and Christian Schools (ACCS). Dominion Christian has campuses in Oakton, Reston, and Potomac Falls, Virginia.

History
Dominion Christian School opened its doors in September 1996 as a quality independent school that was founded upon the time-tested methods of a Classical methodology within the framework of a Christian worldview. The goal of Dominion Christian School is to instill its students a love for learning, and to provide an orderly and nurturing atmosphere in which these ideals can be achieved.

Education philosophy

Dominion Christian School is a  part of the Classical Christian education movement in the United States.  Its teaching method is based on the Trivium, which is denoted by three stages: Grammar, Dialectic (logic) and Rhetoric.  The school's pedagogy draws heavily from the Socratic Method and more so from the Harkness Method.

References

External links 
 Home Page
 Association of Classical and Christian Schools

Christian schools in Virginia
Classical schools in Fairfax County, Virginia
Classical Christian schools
Educational institutions established in 1996
High schools in Fairfax County, Virginia
Private K-12 schools in Virginia
1996 establishments in Virginia